Kandahar is a city in Afghanistan, located in the south of the country on the Arghandab River, at an elevation of . It is Afghanistan's second largest city after Kabul, with a population of about 614,118. It is the capital of Kandahar Province as well as the headquarters of the Taliban, formally known as the Islamic Emirate of Afghanistan. It is also the centre of the larger cultural region called Loy Kandahar.  

In 1709, Mirwais Hotak made the region an independent kingdom and turned Kandahar into the capital of the Hotak dynasty. In 1747, Ahmad Shah Durrani, founder of the Durrani dynasty, made Kandahar the capital of the Afghan Empire. Historically this province is considered as an important political area for Afghanistan revelations. Many empires have long fought over the city due to its strategic location along the trade routes of southern, central and western Asia. 

Kandahar is one of the most culturally significant cities of the Pashtuns and has been their traditional seat of power for more than 300 years. It is a major trading center for sheep, wool, cotton, silk, felt, food grains, fresh and dried fruit, and tobacco. The region produces fine fruits, especially pomegranates and grapes, and the city has plants for canning, drying, and packing fruit, and is a major source of marijuana and hashish.

The region around Kandahar is one of the oldest known human settlements. A major fortified city existed at the site of Kandahar, probably as early as  1000–750 BC, and it became an important outpost of the Achaemenid (Persian) Empire in the 6th century BC. Alexander the Great had laid-out the foundation of what is now Old Kandahar in the 4th century BC and gave it the Ancient Greek name Ἀλεξάνδρεια Ἀραχωσίας.

Name
The city was founded by Alexander the Great in 330 BC who named it Alexandria in Arachosia, which was the recorded name for this city until the Islamic conquest. It is suggested that the name "Kandahar" evolved from "Iskandar" pronounced as "Scandar" , in the local dialect version of the name Alexander. The change of the name from "Scandar" to Candar is mentioned by the 16th-century Portuguese historian João de Barros in his most famous work, Décadas da Ásia.

A folk etymology offered is that the word "kand" or "qand" in Persian and Pashto (the local languages) is the origin of the word "candy". The name "Candahar" or "Kandahar" in this form probably translates to candy area. This probably has to do with the location being fertile and historically known for producing fine grapes, pomegranates, apricots, melons and other sweet fruits.

Ernst Herzfeld claimed Kandahar perpetuated the name of the Indo-Parthian king Gondophares, who re-founded the city under the name Gundopharron. An alternative etymology derives the name of the city from Gandhara, the name of an ancient Hindu-Buddhist kingdom located between the Kunar River and Indus River, centred on the Peshawar Valley.

History

Prehistory

Excavations of prehistoric sites by archaeologists such as Louis Dupree and others suggest that the region around Kandahar is one of the oldest human settlements known so far.

British excavations in the 1970s discovered that Kandahar existed as a large fortified city during the early 1st millennium BC; while this earliest period at Kandahar has not been precisely dated via radiocarbon, ceramic comparisons with the latest period at the major Bronze Age city of Mundigak have suggested an approximate time-frame of 1000 to 750 BC. This fortified city became an important outpost of the Achaemenid Empire in the 6th to 4th centuries BC, and formed part of the province of Arachosia.

Alexandria

The now "Old Kandahar" was founded in 330 BC by Alexander the Great, near the site of the ancient city of Mundigak (established around 3000 BC). Mundigak served as the provincial capital of Arachosia and was ruled by the Medes followed by the Achaemenids until the arrival of the Macedonians. The main inhabitants of Arachosia were the Pakhtas, an ancient Indo-Iranian tribe, who may be among the ancestors of today's Pashtuns. Kandahar was named Alexandria, a name given to cities that Alexander founded during his conquests.

Kandahar has been a frequent target for conquest because of its strategic location in Asia, controlling the main trade route linking the Indian subcontinent with the Middle East and Central Asia. The territory became part of the Seleucid Empire after the death of Alexander. It is mentioned by Strabo that a treaty of friendship was established eventually between the Greeks and the Mauryas (Indians). The city eventually became part of the Greco-Bactrian Kingdom (250 BC – 125 BC), and continued that way for two hundred years under the later Indo-Greek Kingdom (180 BC – 10 AD). 

While the Diadochi were warring amongst themselves, the Mauryas were developing in the northern part of the Indian subcontinent. The founder of the empire, Chandragupta Maurya, confronted a Macedonian invasion force led by Seleucus I in 305 BC and following a brief conflict, an agreement was reached as Seleucus ceded Gandhara and Arachosia and areas south of Bagram to the Mauryas. During the 120 years of the Mauryas in southern Afghanistan, Buddhism was introduced and eventually become a major religion alongside Zoroastrianism and local pagan beliefs.

Inscriptions made by Emperor Ashoka, a fragment of Edict 13 in Greek, as well as a full Edict, written in both Greek and Aramaic has been discovered in Kandahar. It is said to be written in excellent Classical Greek, using sophisticated philosophical terms. In this Edict, Ashoka the great uses the word Eusebeia ("Piety") as the Greek translation for the ubiquitous "Dharma" of his other Edicts written in Prakrit.

Islamic period

In the 7th century AD, Arab armies conquered the region with the new religion of Islam but were unable to succeed in fully converting the population. The leader of the expedition that conquered the city was Abbad ibn Ziyad, who governed Sijistan between 673 and 681. In AD 870, Yaqub ibn Layth Saffari, a local ruler of the Saffarid dynasty, conquered Kandahar and the rest of the nearby regions in the name of Islam.

It is believed that the Zunbil dynasty were probably the rulers of the Kandahar region from the 7th century until the late 9th century AD. Kandahar was taken by Sultan Mahmud of Ghazni in the 11th century followed by the Ghurids of Ghor.

Kandahar appears to have been renamed Teginābād in the 10th-12th centuries, but the origin of the new name is unclear. During this period, nearby Panjway served as the administrative center for the area. However, Kandahar was of much more strategic importance, to the extent that Minhaj-i-Siraj attributes the downfall of the Ghaznavids to the loss of Kandahar. The city's name was changed back to Kandahar by the 13th century, after Ala ad-Din Husayn Jahansuz sacked Lashkari Bazar, near Bost. Again, the reason for the name change is not clear.

Kandahar was besieged by a Mongol army in 1221, although Jalal ad-Din Mingburnu defeated them. In 1251, upon accession to the Mongol throne, Möngke Khan granted Kandahar, along with other lands in Afghanistan, to Shams ad-Din Mohammad Kart of the Kart dynasty. However, the city is mentioned as being under Chagatai control in 1260–61; Kandahar didn't come under Kart control until 1281. Later, in 1318, a Chagatai prince raised an army from Kandahar against the Ilkhanid governor of Sistan. Kandahar was described by Ibn Battuta in 1333 as a large and prosperous town three nights journey from Ghazni.

Timur the Great, founder of the Timurid Empire, captured Kandahar in 1383. He appointed his grandson Pir Muhammad as governor of Kandahar in 1390. Following his death in 1405, the city was ruled by other Timurid governors. Kandahar was entrusted to the Arghuns in the late 15th century, who eventually achieved independence from the Timurids. Guru Nanak, the founder of Sikhism, is believed to have visited the town (c. 1521 AD) during his important journey between Hindustan and Mecca in Arabia.

Tamerlane's descendant, Babur, the founder of the Mughal Empire, annexed Kandahar in 1508. In 1554, Babur's son, Humayun, handed it over to the Safavid Shah Tahmasp in return of 12,000 soldiers he received from the Shah to reconquer India. In 1595, Humayun's son Akbar the Great reconquered the city by diplomacy. Akbar died in 1605 and when this news reached the Persian court, Shah Abbas ordered his army to besiege the city which continued until early 1606 and finally failed due to the reinforcements sent by the Mughal Emperor Jahangir that forced the Safavid retreat. In the Mughal–Safavid War, Kandahar was once again lost to the Safavids. In 1698, Mughals under Samandar Khan of Kalat State captured Kandahar again. Kandahar was regarded as important to the Mughal Empire because it was one of the gateways to India, and Mughal control over Kandahar helped to prevent foreign intrusions.

The memory of the wars fought over Kandahar at this time is preserved in the epic poem Qandahār-nāma ("The Campaign Against Qandahār"), a major work of Saib Tabrizi which is a classic of Persian literature.

Modern

Mirwais Hotak, chief of the Ghilji tribe, revolted in 1709 by killing Gurgin Khan, an ethnic Georgian subject and governor of the Shia Safavid Persians. After establishing the Hotak dynasty in Kandahar, Mirwais and his army successfully defeated subsequent expeditions by Kay Khusraw and Rustam Khán. Mirwais resisted attempts by the Persian government who were seeking to convert the Afghans from Sunni to the Shia sect of Islam. He died of a natural death in November 1715 and was succeeded by his brother Abdul Aziz, but after being suspected of giving Kandahar's sovereignty back to the Persians he was killed by his nephew Mahmud Hotak.

In 1722, Mahmud led an army of Afghans to the Safavid capital Isfahan and proclaimed himself King of Persia. The Hotak dynasty was eventually removed from power by a new Persian ruler, Nader Shah. In 1738, Nader Shah invaded Afghanistan and destroyed the now Old Kandahar, which was held by Hussain Hotak and his Ghilji tribes. In the meantime, Nader Shah freed Ahmad Khan (later Ahmad Shah Durrani) and his brother Zulfikar who were held prisoners by the Hotak ruler. Before leaving southern Afghanistan for Delhi in India, Nader Shah laid out the foundation for a new town to be built next to the destroyed ancient city, naming it "Naderabad". His rule ended in June 1747 after being murdered by his Persian guards.

Ahmad Shah Durrani, chief of the Durrani tribe, gained control of Kandahar and made it the capital of his new Afghan Empire in October 1747. Initially, Ahmad Shah had trouble finding land on which to build his city. His own tribe had no extensive lands and others who had, such as the Alikozai and Barakzai, refused to give up their lands. Only the Popalzai finally offered him his pick of their lands. The foundations for the city were laid in June, 1761. Once begun, the city was built with grand proportions. It was laid out in the form of a regular rectangle with a circumference of three miles; walls 30 feet thick at the bottom and 15 feet at the top, rose 27 feet high to enclose it. Outside, the walls were ringed by a moat 24 feet wide. Six mammoth gateways pierced these walls: the Eid Gah Gate on the north, the Shikarpur Gate on the south; the Herat and Top Khana Gates on the west; and, the Bar Durrani and Kabul Gates on the east. At its peak, Ahmad Shah's empire included present-day Afghanistan, Pakistan, the Khorasan and Kohistan provinces of Iran, along with Punjab in India. In October 1772, Ahmad Shah retired and died from a natural cause. A new city was laid out by Ahmad Shah and is dominated by his mausoleum, which is adjacent to the Mosque of the Cloak in the centre of the city. By 1776, his eldest son Timur Shah had transferred Afghanistan's main capital, due to several conflicts with various Pashtun tribes, from Kandahar to Kabul, where the Durrani legacy continued.

From 1818 to 1855, Kandahar was ruled by half-brothers of Dost Mohammad Khan as an independent principality. In September 1826, Syed Ahmad Shaheed's followers arrived to Kandahar in search of volunteers to help them wage jihad against the Sikh invaders to what is now Pakistan. Led by Ranjit Singh, the Sikhs had captured several of Afghanistan's territories in the east, including what is now Khyber Pakhtunkhwa and Kashmir. More than 400 local Kandahar warriors assembled themselves for the jihad. Sayed Din Mohammad Kandharai was appointed as their leader.

British-led Indian forces from neighbouring British India invaded the city in 1839, during the First Anglo-Afghan War, but withdrew in 1842. In November 1855 Dost Mohammad Khan conquered Kandahar. The British and Indian forces returned in 1878 during the Second Anglo-Afghan War. They emerged from the city in July 1880 to confront the forces of Ayub Khan, but were defeated at the Battle of Maiwand. They were again forced to withdraw a few years later, despite winning the Battle of Kandahar.

Kandahar remained peaceful for the next 100 years, except during 1929 when loyalists of Habibullah Kalakani (Bache Saqqaw) placed the fortified city on lock-down and began torturing its population. Nobody was allowed to enter or leave from within the city's tall defensive walls, and as a result of this many people suffered after running out of food supplies. This lasted until October 1929 when Nadir Khan and his Afghan army came to eliminate Kalakani, known as the Tajik bandit from the village of Kalakan in northern Kabul Province.

During Zahir Shah's rule, the city slowly began expanding by adding modern style streets and housing schemes. In the 1960s, during the rivalry between the United States and the Soviet Union, Kandahar International Airport was built by the U.S. Army Corps of Engineers next to the city. The U.S. also completed several other major projects in Kandahar and in other parts of southern Afghanistan. In the meantime, Soviet engineers were busy building major infrastructures in other parts of the country, such as Bagram Airfield and Kabul International Airport.

During the 1980s, Soviet–Afghan War, Kandahar city (and the province as a whole) witnessed heavy fighting as it became a centre of resistance as the mujahideen forces waged a strong guerrilla warfare against the Soviet-backed government, who tightly held on control of the city. Government and Soviet troops surrounded the city and subjected it to heavy air bombardment in which many civilians lost lives. In January 1982 indiscriminate shelling and bombing by the Soviets killed hundreds. 300 civilians were killed during Soviet bombings in July 1984. It was under siege again in April 1986. Kandahar International Airport was used by the Soviet Army during their ten-year troop placement in the country. The city also became a battle ground for the US and Pakistani-backed against the pro-Communist government of Afghanistan. After the Soviet withdrawal and the collapse of Najibullah's government in 1992, Kandahar fell to local mujahideen commander, Gul Agha Sherzai. However Sherzai lacked authority against other local commanders which led to lawlessness in the city, and fighting in 1993. The city's population was reduced from 200,000 before the war to no more than 25,000 inhabitants, following a months-long campaign of carpet bombing and bulldozing by the Soviets and Afghan communist soldiers in 1987.

In August 1994, the Taliban, under Mohammed Omar Mujahid, captured Kandahar from commander Mullah Naqib almost without a fight and turned the city into their headquarters. The Taliban introduced a strict form of Islamic law, banning formal education for girls as well as the consumption of TV, films, music with instrumental accompaniments, and the playing of sports. In December 1999, a hijacked Indian Airlines Flight 814 plane by Pakistani militants loyal to Harkat-ul-Mujahideen landed at Kandahar International Airport and kept the passengers hostage as part of a demand to release three Pakistani militants from prison in India.

21st century

In October 2001, as part of Operation Enduring Freedom, the United States Navy began hitting targets inside the city by precision-guided cruise missiles that were fired from the Persian Gulf. These targets were the airport and buildings that were occupied by the Taliban, including Arab families who had arrived several years earlier and were residing in the area. About a month later, the Taliban began surrendering in mass numbers to a private militia that had been formed by Gul Agha Sherzai and Hamid Karzai. Kandahar once again fell into the hands of Sherzai, who had control over the area before the rise of the Taliban. He was transferred in 2003 and replaced by Yousef Pashtun until Asadullah Khalid took the post in 2005. The current Governor of the province is Toryalai Wesa. He was appointed by President Hamid Karzai in December 2008 after Rahmatullah Raufi's four-month rule.

As of 2002, Kandahar International Airport is used by members of the United States armed forces and NATO's International Security Assistance Force (ISAF). NATO began training the newly formed Afghan National Police and are now given the security responsibility of the city. The military of Afghanistan, backed by NATO forces, has gradually expanded its authority and presence throughout most of the country. The 205th Corps of the Afghan National Army is based at Kandahar and provides military assistance to the south of the country. The Canadian Forces maintain their military command headquarters at Kandahar, heading the Regional Command South of the NATO led International Security Assistance Force in Kandahar Province. The Taliban also have supporters inside the city reporting on events.

NATO forces expanded the Afghan police force for the prevention of a Taliban comeback in Kandahar, the militants' "spiritual birthplace" and a strategic key to ward off the Taliban insurgency, as a part of a larger effort that also aimed to deliver services such as electricity and clean drinking water that the Taliban could not provide – encouraging support for the government in a city that was once the Taliban's headquarters. The most significant battle between NATO troops and the Taliban lasted throughout the summer of 2006, culminating in Operation Medusa. The Taliban failed to defeat the Western troops in open warfare, which marked a turn in their tactics towards IED emplacement. In June 2008, it was reported that over 1,000 inmates had escaped from Sarposa prison. In Spring 2010, the province and the city of Kandahar became a target of American operations following Operation Moshtarak in the neighbouring Helmand Province. In March 2010, U.S. and NATO commanders released details of plans for the biggest offensive of the war against the Taliban insurgency.

In May 2010, Kandahar International Airport became subject of a combined rocket and ground attack by insurgents, following similar attacks on Kabul and Bagram in the preceding weeks. Although this attack did not lead to many casualties on the side of NATO forces, it did show that the militants are still capable of launching multiple, coordinated operations in Afghanistan. In June 2010, a shura was held by Afghan President Hamid Karzai with tribal and religious leaders of the Kandahar region. The meeting highlighted the need for support of NATO-led forces in order to stabilize parts of the province.

By 2011, Kandahar became known as the assassination city of Afghanistan after witnessing many targeted killings. In July Ahmed Wali Karzai, brother of President Hamid Karzai, was shot by his long time head of security. Soon after the Quetta Shura of the Taliban claimed responsibility. The next day an Islamic cleric (mulla) of the famous Red Mosque in the Shahr-e Naw area of the city and a number of other people were killed by a Taliban suicide bomber who had hidden explosives inside his turban. On 27 July 2011, the mayor of the city, Ghulam Haider Hamidi, was assassinated by another Taliban militant who had hidden explosives in his turban. Two deputy mayors had been killed in 2010, while many tribal elders and Islamic clerics have also been assassinated in the last several years.

Pakistan's Inter-Services Intelligence (ISI) spy network is often blamed as the masterminds behind the Taliban-led insurgency. The Afghan government alleges that the ISI is using the insurgents in the name of Islamic jihad to counter the growing influence of its rival India in Afghanistan and the Afghan claim regarding the disputed Durand Line border. The overwhelming majority of the victims in the attacks are ordinary Afghan civilians. On 6 June 2012, at least 21 civilians were killed and 50 others injured when two Taliban suicide bombers on motorcycles blew themselves up in a market area near Kandahar International Airport.

On 4 May 2020, a policewoman was assassinated in the centre of Kandahar, making her the fifth policewoman to be killed during the previous two months in Kandahar. No group claimed responsibility for the killing of the policewomen.

On 12 August 2021, the Taliban captured Kandahar. After days of brutal clashes with ANA soldiers retreating from the city, the Taliban were finally able to capture the city. It became the twelfth provincial capital to be seized by Taliban as part of the wider 2021 Taliban offensive.

On 15 October 2021, four suicide bombers killed dozens at a Shia mosque in the city.

Geography
The Arghandab River runs along the west of Kandahar. The city has 15 districts and a total land area of 27,337 hectares. The total number of dwellings in Kandahar is 61,902.

Only 64% of families in Kandahar have access to safe drinking water; 22% of households have access to safe toilet facilities; and 27% of households have access to electricity, with the remainder dependent on public power. Kandahar's transportation infrastructure is well-developed, with 76.8% of the province's roads capable of carrying car traffic in all seasons. However, there are no roads in a minor portion of the province (3.3 percent). In terms of telecommunications, Kandahar City and major roadways are covered by the three major mobile networks AWCC, Roshan, and MTN.

Land use
Kandahar is the regional hub in southern Afghanistan, close to the border with Pakistan. Non-built up land use accounts for 59% of the total land area. Within the built-up area, vacant plots occupy a slightly higher percentage of land (36%) than residential land (34%). There is a significant commercial cluster along the road to Pakistan in District 5. India, Iran and Pakistan have consulates here for trade, military and political links.

Climate
Kandahar has a hot desert climate (Köppen BWh), characterised by little precipitation and high variation between summer and winter temperatures. Summers start in mid-May, last until late September, and are extremely dry. They are followed by dry autumns from early October to late November, with days still averaging in the 20s °C (above 68 °F) into November, although nights are sharply cooler. Winter begins in December and sees most of its precipitation in the form of rain. Temperatures average  in January, although lows can drop well below freezing. They end in early March and are followed by a pleasant spring until late April with temperatures generally in the upper 10s °C to lower 30s °C (65–88 °F) range. Sunny weather dominates year-round, especially in summer, when rainfall is extremely rare.

Transport

Kandahar International Airport serves as southern Afghanistan's main airport for domestic and international flights. It is also used as a major military base as well as shipping and receiving of supplies for the NATO armies. The entire area in and around the airport is heavily guarded but a section is designated for civilian passengers. Most international flights are to the UAE, Iran, India, Saudi Arabia, and Pakistan.

Pakistan plans to build a railroad track from the Pakistani town of Chaman to Kandahar which will connect Afghan Railways with Pakistan Railways. The feasibility study was completed in 2006 but  no construction work had begun.

Kandahar is connected to Quetta Pakistan via Chaman and Kabul by the Kabul-Kandahar Highway and to Herat by the Kandahar-Herat Highway. There is a bus station located at the start of the Kabul-Kandahar Highway, where a number of privately owned older-model Mercedes-Benz coach buses are available to take passengers to most major cities of the country. Kandahar is also connected by road to Quetta in neighbouring Pakistan. Due to the ongoing war, the route to Kabul has become increasingly dangerous as insurgent attacks on convoys and destruction of bridges make it an unreliable link between the two cities.

Commuters in the city of Kandahar use the public bus system (Milli Bus), and taxicabs and rickshaws are common. Private vehicle use is increasing, partially due to road and highway improvements. Large dealerships are importing cars from Dubai, UAE.

Demography and population 
Kandahar has a population of approximately 1,057,500 people in 2008. In the province, there are around 14,445 households, with an average of seven individuals per home. Around 68 percent of Kandahar's population resides in rural districts, with males accounting for 51 percent of the population. Pashtuns are the province's most largest ethnic group. Major Pashtun tribes such as the Tareen or Durrani including Barakzai, Popalzai, Alkozai, Noorzai, Ishaqzai, Achakzai, Maku, and Alizai and Khilji are included. More than 98 percent of the population speaks Pashtu. 88 center for learning army lessons. Only a small percentage of the population speaks Balochi language and Dari. Kochi people (Pashtun Nomads) also live in Kandahar province, and their numbers fluctuate depending on the season, with estimates stating approximately 79,000 in the winter and 39,000 in the summer.

Education

Before the 1978 coup in Kabul, majority of the city's population were enrolled in schools. Nearly all of the elite class of the city fled to neighboring Pakistan during the early 1980s, and from there they began immigrating to North America, Europe, Australia and other parts of the world.

The two oldest known schools are Ahmad Shah Baba High School and Zarghona Ana High School. There are a number of new schools that opened in the last decade, with more being built in the future as the city's population grows with the large returning Afghans from neighboring countries. Afghan Turk High Schools is one of the top private schools in the city.

The main university is the Kandahar University. A number of private higher education institutions have also opened in the last decade such as Benawa Institute of Higher Education, Mirwais Neeka Institute of Higher Education, Malalay Institute of Higher Education and Saba Institute of Higher Education.

The adult literacy rate ratio was 16.8% in 2012.

Communications

Telecommunication services in the city are provided by Afghan Wireless, Roshan, Etisalat, MTN Group and Afghan Telecom. In November 2006, the Afghan Ministry of Communications signed a $64.5 million agreement with ZTE for the establishment of a countrywide fibre optical cable network. This was intended to improve telephone, internet, television and radio broadcast services not just in Kandahar but throughout the country.

Places of interest

The tomb of Ahmad Shah Durrani is located in the city centre, which also houses Durrani's brass helmet and other personal items. In front of Durrani's mausoleum is the Shrine of the Cloak, containing one of the most valued relics in the Islamic world, which was given by the Emir of Bokhara (Murad Beg) to Ahmad Shah Durrani. The Sacred Cloak is kept locked away, taken out only at times of great crisis. Mullah Omar took it out in November 1996 and displayed it to a crowd of ulema of religious scholars to have himself declared Amir al-Mu'minin (Commander of the Faithful). Prior to that it was taken out when the city was struck by a cholera epidemic in the 1930s.

The village of Sher Surkh is located southeast of the city, in the suburbs of the old city of Nadirabad. Kandahar Museum is located at the western end of the third block of buildings lining the main road east of Eidgah Durwaza (gate). It has many paintings by the now famous Ghiyassuddin, painted while he was a young teacher in Kandahar. He is acknowledged among Afghanistan's leading artists.

Just to the north of the city, off its northeast corner at the end of buria (matting) bazaar, there is a shrine dedicated to a saint who lived in Kandahar more than 300 years ago. A monument to Islamic martyrs stands in the centre of Kandahar's main square, called Da Shahidanu Chawk, which was built in the 1940s.

The Chilzina is a rock-cut chamber above the plain at the end of the rugged chain of mountains forming the western defence of Kandahar's Old City. This is here that Ashoka's Kandahar Bilingual Rock Inscription was found. Forty steps, about, lead to the chamber, which is guarded by two chained lions, defaced, and inscribed with an account of Mughal conquest. The rugged cliffs from which the Chilzina was hewn form the natural western bastion of the Old City of Kandahar, which was destroyed in 1738 by Nadir Shah Afshar of Persia.

A short distance from Chilzina, going west on the main highway, a bright blue dome appears on the right. This is the mausoleum of Mirwais Hotak, the Ghiljai chieftain who declared Kandahar's independence from the Persians in 1709. The shrine of Baba Wali Kandhari (Baba Sahib), its terraces shaded by pomegranate groves beside the Arghandab River, is also very popular for picnics and afternoon outings. He was a Muslim pir who had a strange encounter with Guru Nanak at Hasan Abdal in what is now Attock District of Pakistan. The shrine of Baba Wali is important to Muslims and Sikhs. Close to Baba Wali's shrine is a military base established by the United States armed forces in about 2007.

Development and modernization

Decades of war left Kandahar and the rest of the country destroyed and depopulated, but in recent years billions of dollars began pouring in for construction purposes and millions of expats have returned to Afghanistan. New residential areas have been established around the city, and a number of modern-style buildings have been constructed.

Some residents of the city have access to clean drinking water and electricity, and the government is working to extend these services to every home. The city relies on electricity from the Kajaki hydroelectricity plant in neighbouring Helmand, which is being upgraded or expanded.

The Aino Mina is a new housing project for up to two million people on the northern edge of the city. Originally called the Kandahar Valley and started by Mahmud Karzai, it was announced that the project would build up to 20,000 single-family homes and associated infrastructure such as roads, water and sewer systems, and community buildings, including schools.

It recently won 2 awards, the Residential Project and Sustainable Project of the Year at the Middle East Architect Awards. Many of the high-ranking government employees and civil servants as well as wealthy businessmen live in this area, which is a more secured community in Kandahar. Work on the next $100 million scheme was initiated in 2011.

Also, construction of Hamidi Township in the Morchi Kotal area of the city began in August 2011. It is named after Ghulam Haider Hamidi, the mayor of Kandahar who was assassinated by militants in late July 2011. Situated along the Kandahar-Uruzgan Highway in the northeast of the city, the new township will have 2,000 residential and commercial plots. Including new roads, schools, commercial markets, clinics, canals and other facilities.

The park will have professional management for the daily maintenance of public roads, internal streets, common areas, parking areas, 24 hours perimeter security, access control for vehicles and persons.

Airports
Kandahar International Airport

Neighborhoods

Aino Meyna (under development since 2003)
Hamidi Meyna (under development since 2011)
Share Naw (meaning New City)
Dand
Karz
Mirwais Meyna
Daman
Sarpuza
Malajat
Old Kandahar (Zorr Shar)
Arghandab Valley

Cultural sites and parks

Kandahar Park 
Baba Saab
Kokaran Park
Baghi Pul Park 
Chilzina View (Moghul Emperor Babur's inscription site)
Kandahar Museum

Mosques and shrines 

Friday Mosque of Kandahar
Shrine of the Cloak
Mosque of the Hair of the Prophet
Mosque at Kandahar University (Eidgah Jaami Jumat)

Mausoleums 
Mausoleum of Ahmad Shah Durrani
Mausoleum of Mirwais Hotak
Mausoleum of Baba Wali

Shopping

Al-Jadeed indoor shopping center 
Herat Bazaar
Kabul Bazaar
Shah Bazaar
Shkar Pur Bazaar
Piaroz Super store 
Kandahr Super Store
Samimi Super Store

Hospitals

Afghan National Army Regional Hospital
Mirwais Hospital
Sial Curative Hospital
Bilal Hospital
Momand Hospital
Sydal Hospital

Banks
AIB Bank
Kabul Bank
Azizi Bank

Sports

Professional sports teams from Kandahar

Stadium
Kandahar International Cricket Stadium (under construction)
Kandahar Stadium used for football
Ahmad Shahi Stadium, 20,000-capacity, used for football

Demography and culture

The population of Kandahar numbers approximately 651,484 . The Pashtuns make up the overwhelming majority population of the city and province but exact figures are not available. In a 2003 estimate by the National Geographic, Pashtuns were put at ca. 70%, Tajiks 20%, Baloch 2%, and Uzbeks 2%.

Pashto is the main language in the city and the region. Persian is also understood by a few number of the city dwellers, especially those serving in the government. Both are the official languages of Afghanistan. A 2006 compendium of provincial data prepared by the Afghan Ministry of Rural Rehabilitation and Development and United Nations Assistance Mission in Afghanistan (UNAMA) states:

In another report, by BBC news Farsi, there are roughly 50,000-100,000 Tajik or Persian speakers in the city of Kandahar. The "Council for Tajiks of the south" head office is also based in Kandahar city.

The Pashtun culture, history, traditions, clothing and Pashtunwali is dominant in this region.

Notable people 

Kandahari Begum, wife of Mughal emperor Shah Jahan
Nur Jahan – Empress of the Mughal Empire
Mirwais Hotak – founder of the Hotak dynasty
Abdul Aziz Hotak – ruler of the Hotak dynasty
Mahmud Hotak – ruler of the Hotak dynasty and Shah of Persia
Ashraf Hotak – Shah of Persia
Hussain Hotak – ruler of the Hotak dynasty
Ahmad Shah Durrani – founding father of Afghanistan, buried in the city
Dost Mohammad Khan – Emir of Afghanistan and son of Payandah Khan
Sher Ali Khan – Emir of Afghanistan and son of Dost Mohammad Khan
Abdur Rahman Khan – Emir of Afghanistan and son of Dost Mohammad Khan
Ghulam Muhammad Tarzi – leader of Tarzi family who played an important part in Afghan history during the late 19th century onward
Abdul Rehman Khan, father of Bollywood actor Kader Khan
Mohammad Ibraheem Khwakhuzhi
Maryam Durani an Afghan activist and women's advocate
Ubaidullah Jan – Pashto music king of southern Afghanistan
Naghma – Afghan singer
Nashenas – Afghan musician
Abdul Hai Habibi – scholar, former professor at Kabul University and author of many books
The Karzais – the family of Afghan President Hamid Karzai
Gul Agha Sherzai – served as the governor of Kandahar Province followed by as governors of Nangarhar Province
Said Tayeb Jawad – former Afghanistan Ambassador to the United States
Yousef Pashtun – Afghan politician
Khan Mohammad Mujahid – Alokozai tribe leader

See also

Kandahar Province
Old Kandahar
Arachosia
Alexandria Arachosia
Yazidis of Kandahar
Operation Dreamseed

Footnotes

References

Hill, John E. 2004. The Peoples of the West from the Weilue 魏略 by Yu Huan 魚豢: A Third Century Chinese Account Composed between 239 and 265 CE. Draft annotated English translation.
Hill, John E. (2009) Through the Jade Gate to Rome: A Study of the Silk Routes during the Later Han dynasty, 1st to 2nd centuries CE. BookSurge, Charleston, South Carolina. .
Frye, Richard N. (1963). The Heritage of Persia. World Publishing company, Cleveland, Ohio. Mentor Book edition, 1966.
Toynbee, Arnold J. (1961). Between Oxus and Jumna. London. Oxford University Press.
Willem Vogelsang (1985). "Early historical Arachosia in South-east Afghanistan; Meeting-place between East and West." Iranica antiqua, 20 (1985), pp. 55–99.
Wood, Michael (1997). In the Footsteps of Alexander the Great: A Journey from Greece to Asia. University of California Press.

Further reading
Published in the 19th century

Boulger, Demetrius Charles. Ought We to Hold Candahar?. London: William H. Allen and Company (1879).

Published in the 20th century

Published in the 21st century

External links

Map of Kandahar, from Afghanistan Information Management Services

 
Populated places established in the 4th century BC
330s BC establishments
Populated places in Kandahar Province
Cities founded by Alexander the Great
Populated places along the Silk Road
Cities in Central Asia
Cities in Afghanistan
Provincial capitals in Afghanistan